Mondaine is the trademark for a series of watches made by the Swiss company Mondaine Watch Ltd.
This company was founded by Erwin Bernheim. Initially, he exported wristwatches manufactured by different Swiss watchmakers. Subsequently, he started manufacturing lever watches at Remonta AG, a subsidiary of Mondaine in Biberist, Switzerland.

A line of Mondaine watches is heavily influenced by classical Swiss railway clocks, called the Official Swiss Railways Watch / SBB, to a design licensed from the Swiss Federal Railways since 1986. This design, by Hans Hilfiker, originated in 1944.

The original movement was unlike other watches and unique because of the following fact:
By spreading 58 seconds over the 360 degrees (rather than the usual 60 seconds), the second hand comes to a complete stop at the 12 numeral for two seconds, giving the illusion that time has stopped. Then, the minute hand advances one step and the second hand starts a new cycle. However, the company stopped making models with this mechanism around 2001. In 2013, a redesigned model was launched under the name stop2go. In keeping with how the movement itself works, the crown is shaped like a rocker switch that you flip back and forth instead of winding.

In 2006, a fifty-percent stake in the American Luminox company was purchased by Mondaine, giving Mondaine increased access to the American market, and Luminox increased access to the European and Asian markets. The speciality of Luminox watches is their self-powered luminous readability at night using miniature Tritium devices manufactured by mb-microtec, another Swiss company. In 2016, Mondaine took over the remaining part of the Luminox company and manufactured these watches in Switzerland using the Swiss made label. Luminox watches became a major part of revenues for the Mondaine Group in 2020.

Additionally, Mondaine offers a selection of models inspired by modern art and markets fashionable watches under the Pierre Cardin brand.

Controversy over Apple iPad's iOS 6 clock design
In 2012, Apple's iPad clock design in iOS 6 resembled a trademarked design created in 1944 by SBB employee Hans Hilfiker, which is now licensed to Mondaine. Upon threat of lawsuit from Mondaine, Apple agreed to settle the matter out of court. Apple paid 22.5 million Swiss Francs to Swiss Federal Railways to license the design for use in their iPad clock.

References

External links
 www.mondaine-group.com - Official web site
 www.mondaine.com - Official web site

Swiss watch brands